Turiacus was a Celtic and Lusitanian god of power of the Grovii, in the cultural area of Gallaecia and Lusitania (in the territory of modern Galicia (Spain) and Portugal). Turiacus seems to have been particularly worshiped by the Grovii, a people of Gallaecia.

The name of the deity would have the root word tor, which in Irish means lord, king and noble, but also could have its origin in the word torc which means, in Irish as in Scottish Gaelic, wild boar, as the archaeologist Leite de Vasconcelos noted in his studies and his literary works. The Boar was an animal in which warlike qualities were recognized by the ancient peoples, for they were wild, strong and fearless.

Turiacus, was a Warrior God, known for his wild, fearless and courageous character. The name attributed to the city Santo Tirso and its Santo Tirso Monastery, may have its origin in the name of this Lusitanian deity, and there may have been connection between the two deities, Tirso and Turiacus since it was very common for pagan and pre-Christian divinities to be adopted by Christianity in order to facilitate the integration of the European peoples into this new religion (Christianity) that spread throughout Europe.

To this Lusitanian deity, requests of courage and strength were made, so that they would be victorious or would simply get out alive from a battle.

In the Monastery of Santo Tirso (Portugal), there is a tombstone on one of the walls that contains an inscription dedicated to Turiacus.

References

European gods
Lusitanian gods

References:

- Harald Fuchs, Encyclopedia Mythica, Turiacus.

- Alexandre Gabriel, Mandrágora - O Almanaque Pagão 2009 - Usos e Costumes Mágicos da Lusitânia

- Literary Works and Books from the Portuguese archaeologist, Leite de Vasconcelos.